Jörg Bergen (born 27 June 1966, in Marbach am Neckar) is a German football manager and former player.

Bergen made 24 Bundesliga appearances for SpVgg Unterhaching during his playing career.

References

External links 
 

1966 births
Living people
People from Marbach am Neckar
Sportspeople from Stuttgart (region)
German footballers
Association football defenders
Bundesliga players
2. Bundesliga players
Stuttgarter Kickers II players
SpVgg Unterhaching players
FC Bayern Munich II players
German football managers
Footballers from Baden-Württemberg
SpVgg Unterhaching II players